William Emmet Shields (June 6, 1861 – August 14, 1893) was an American lawyer and politician from New York.

Life 
William was born on June 6, 1861, in Brooklyn. His father Michael was Chief Clerk in the Second District Civil Court, and his mother Bridget was an Irish immigrant.

Studying law under Kings County District Attorney James W. Ridgway, William became a lawyer at the age of 21. In 1884, he served as attorney for Charles H. Rugg, an accused murderer from Queens.

In 1891, William was elected to the New York State Assembly, representing the Kings County 6th District. He served in the Assembly in 1890, 1891, 1892, and 1893.

William was a commander of the Oak council, American Legion of Honor.

On August 14, 1893, William died from colorectal cancer in New York Hospital, Manhattan. He was buried in Calvary Cemetery in Woodside, Queens.

References

External links 

 Political Graveyard
 Find a Grave

1861 births
1893 deaths
Politicians from Brooklyn
American people of Irish descent
Members of the New York State Assembly
19th-century American politicians
Lawyers from Brooklyn
Burials at Calvary Cemetery (Queens)
Deaths from cancer in New York (state)
Deaths from colorectal cancer
19th-century American lawyers